Chebseh-ye Kuchek (also Romanized as Chebseh-ye Kūchek; also known as Chepseh-ye Kūchek and Chopseh-ye Kūchek) is a village in Elhayi Rural District, in the Central District of Ahvaz County, Khuzestan Province, Iran. At the 2006 census, its population was 306, in 58 families.

References 

Populated places in Ahvaz County